NBC 10 may refer to one of the following television stations in the United States:

Current

Owned-and-operated stations
WBTS-CD in Nashua, New Hampshire / Boston, Massachusetts (cable channel; broadcasts on channel 15)
WCAU in Philadelphia, Pennsylvania

Affiliated stations
KMOT in Minot, North Dakota
KTEN in Ada, Oklahoma / Sherman, Texas
KTTC in Rochester/Austin, Minnesota
KTVE in El Dorado, Arkansas / Monroe, Louisiana
WALB in Albany, Georgia
WAVY-TV in Portsmouth/Norfolk/Newport News, Virginia
WBIR-TV in Knoxville, Tennessee
WGEM-TV in Quincy, Illinois / Hannibal, Missouri
WHEC-TV in Rochester, New York
WILX-TV in Onondaga/Jackson/Lansing, Michigan
WIS in Columbia, South Carolina
WJAR in Providence, Rhode Island
WSLS-TV in Roanoke/Lynchburg, Virginia

Former
KAKE in Wichita, Kansas (1954 to 1956)
KENV-DT in Elko, Nevada (1997 to 2018)
KERO-TV in Bakersfield, California (1953 to 1963)
KFSD-TV/KOGO-TV/KGTV in San Diego, California (1953 to 1977)
KMED/KTVL in Medford, Oregon (1961 to 1983)
WALA-TV in Mobile, Alabama (1953 to 1996)
WSZE in Saipan, Northern Mariana Islands
Was a satellite of KUAM-TV in Hagåtña, Guam
WTTV in Bloomington, Indiana (1949 to 1954)